Tae-hong Choi (May 28, 1935 – March 8, 2009) was a grandmaster in taekwondo, winner of multiple martial arts titles and a teacher of thousands of students in Oregon.

Childhood studies
When Choi was a boy in Seoul, he had a paper route.  When he first approached the martial artists he met on his route, they sent him away.  After seven days of his pestering, the men seemed to relent, but they put him to work instead of teaching him. Choi worked for them for three weeks before they were sufficiently impressed to begin teaching him. He earned his black belt in two years. He soon began winning titles including Korean National Champion.  Eventually he earned a ninth-degree black belt, the sport's highest designation.  He also studied for a master's degree in Health and physical education.

Military service
Choi was a Korean Marine Corp Training officer stationed in South Vietnam.  He was part of the detail that guarded the U.S. Embassy.  He taught hand-to-hand combat skills to Korean, South Vietnamese and U.S. Special Forces. That got him his next job of instructing hand-to-hand combat for top-level U.S. security agents.

Emigration
Choi moved to Washington, D.C., in 1971. He taught taekwondo to secret service agents and CIA operatives.  His family did not move with him to Washington, D.C., but they emigrated to Oregon where a distant cousin lived.  In 1972, Choi joined his family in Oregon and started teaching tae kwon do at the YMCA, Lewis and Clark College and Reed College (Judo - '74-'75), and Sunset High School before opening his own studio in Northeast Portland.  Choi's Taekwondo Academy was the first taekwondo school in Oregon.  "Mr. Choi was one of the pioneers for tae kwon do in this country.  When the word 'tae kwon do' didn't even exist in this country, he was already teaching." -- Joon Pyo Choi, co-chairman of USA Taekwondo's martial arts commission.  Choi eventually opened two more schools for students in Beaverton and North Portland. His son, Sung Choi did take over the studios after his death with the help of Hung Choi. Later, Sung Choi started teaching at the "New York Athletic Club' location in NYC.

National leadership
Choi founded the Oregon State Taekwondo Association and the Northwest Black Belt Association and was its president for 30 years. In 1980, Choi served as head of team at the first Pan American Taekwondo Championships.  In 1982, When the Amateur Athletic Union was the governing body for Taekwondo in the USA, Choi was elected vice president.  He also served as a vice president in the United States TaeKwonDo Union.    He has served as tournament director of the Northwest Oregon Taekwondo Championships and the 17th U.S. National Taekwondo Championships.  In 1988, Choi traveled to Seoul with one of his students who competed in the 1988 Olympic Games.  In the 1990s, he served as advisor to the United States Taekwondo Union.  In 2007, Choi received the lifetime achievement award from the United States Taekwondo Grandmasters Society. Some of his notable students are Master Leon Preston (8th Dan and 2008 Summer Olympics Tae Kwon Do Referee), Gordon Graaff, Grandmaster Scott Rohr (1979 and 1980 World Championship Medalist) and Naim Hassan (1988 Olympics Taekwondo athlete).

Death and burial
Choi died at Providence Portland Medical Center in Portland, Oregon on March 8, 2009. Services were held March 12 in the Korean Mission Church (Portland). He was buried at Skyline Memorial Gardens (Portland),  He was survived by his wife, two daughters, two sons and five grandchildren. Wife, Man Soon Choi. Daughters, Ilsun Kim, Min Sun Kim. Sons, Sung Choi, Hung Choi. Grandchildren, Angela Kim (23), Matthew Kim (26), Caroline Min (10), Phillip Min (12), Chloe Choi (10).

See also

 List of taekwondo grandmasters

References

External links
Choi's Tae Kwon Do Academy
NW Tae Kwon Do Association Kinship of Black Belts who either trained directly with, or under, senior students of Grandmaster Choi]

1935 births
2009 deaths
South Korean emigrants to the United States
South Korean male taekwondo practitioners